Sonnet 3 is one of 154 sonnets written by the English playwright and poet William Shakespeare. It is often referred to as a procreation sonnet that falls within the Fair Youth sequence.

In the sonnet, the speaker is urging the man being addressed to preserve something of himself and something of the image he sees in the mirror by fathering a child. The “young man” of this and other sonnets is a subject of debate.  Some think it may be based on William Herbert, others consider Henry Wriothesley. There are other candidates as well.

Structure
The poem takes the form of a Shakespearean sonnet: fourteen decasyllabic, iambic pentameter lines, that form three quatrains and a concluding rhyming couplet. It follows the form's rhyme scheme: ABAB CDCD EFEF GG. Each line of the first quatrain of Sonnet 3 exhibits a final extrametrical syllable or feminine ending. The first line additionally exhibits an initial reversal:
 /   ×    ×   /   ×    /     ×  /     ×   / (×)
Look in thy glass and tell the face thou viewest (3.1)
/ = ictus, a metrically strong syllabic position. × = nonictus. (×) = extrametrical syllable.

Analysis
In this sonnet, the poet is urging the 'fair youth' to preserve something of himself and something of the image he sees in the mirror by fathering a child, "Now is the time that face should form another".

The message is reiterated in the last lines of the poem: "But if thou live, remember'd not to be, / Die single, and thine image dies with thee." Not only will the youth die, but so will his image — the one in his mirror, and also his image that may be seen borne by his yet-to-be child.

References

Further reading
Baldwin, T. W. On the Literary Genetics of Shakspeare's Sonnets. Urbana: University of Illinois Press, 1950.
Hubler, Edwin. The Sense of Shakespeare's Sonnets. Princeton: Princeton University Press, 1952.

External links

A paraphrase of the sonnet
Shakespeare's sonnets.com on Sonnet 3

British poems
Sonnets by William Shakespeare